"Cygnus X-1" is a two-part song series by Canadian progressive rock band Rush. The first part, "Book I: The Voyage", is the last song on the 1977 album A Farewell to Kings, and the second part, "Book II: Hemispheres", is the first song on the following album, 1978's Hemispheres. Book I is ten minutes and twenty-five seconds long (10:25), and Book II is eighteen minutes and seven seconds (18:07).

It was released as a limited-edition extended play on April 22, 2017.

General storyline
A black hole, known as Cygnus X-1 (an X-ray source believed to be an actual black hole), lies in the constellation Cygnus. An explorer aboard the spaceship Rocinante journeys toward the black hole, believing there may be something beyond it. As he moves closer, it becomes increasingly difficult to control the ship and he is eventually drawn in by the pull of gravity. The final words of Book I describe his ordeal: "Sound and fury drown my heart/Every nerve is torn apart."

The explorer re-enters the story midway through Book II, left a wandering soul due to the destruction of his body. He has emerged into Olympus, where he witnesses the gods Apollo and Dionysus caught in the struggle between Mind and Heart. Prior to his arrival, the logical thinkers are led by Apollo and the emotional people are ruled by Dionysus. Apollo shows his followers how to build cities and explore the depths of science and knowledge, but a lack of emotional attachment to each other allows Dionysus to lure many of them into the wild forests, where he provides love. Dionysus' followers do not store any food for the winter and are caught unprepared. A conflict breaks out as the two different ways of life clash, leading to the world splintering into hemispheres, each with a deeply unhealthy society.

When the explorer reflects on what he sees, he becomes tormented in the lack of balance of the people who insist on one extreme or the other. His silent scream is felt by the warriors and causes them to rethink their struggle and unite. Wanting someone to keep them in check to avoid a repeat of their conflict, the gods recognize the explorer as a nascent new god and name him Cygnus, the God of Balance. The final words of Book II describe a harmonious society where emotion - "the truth of love" - and logic - "the love of truth" - coexist and feed each other "in a single perfect sphere."

Allusions and allegory
Although the storyline revolves around a science fiction world, it uses Greek mythology to explain the double meaning. "Cygnus X-1" is primarily about the discovery of two conflicting ways of life, and two vastly different ways in which the human mind thinks (logic and emotion are separated into separate sides, or hemispheres, of the brain). The balance point (Cygnus) allows the mind to think with some logic and emotion at the same time, allowing people to be analytical, but not unemotional.

The name of the spaceship Rocinante is derived from the name of the title character's horse in the novel Don Quixote by Miguel de Cervantes. It was also the name of the camper truck John Steinbeck used while writing his book Travels with Charley.

Sections

Book I: The Voyage

"Prologue" This starts with a dissonant electronic soundscape and spoken introduction by album producer Terry Brown. Afterwards, a heavily syncopated bass riff in shifting time signatures (3/4, 7/8, 3/4, 4/4) fades in, with the full band joining in as the introductory sound effects fade out.

"1" The shortest section of the song describes the black hole itself, and asks the question of what happens to someone who flies into it.

"2" The protagonist sails into the black hole on board his "Rocinante". This section contains a wah-wah guitar solo by Alex Lifeson.

"3" The climactic section of Book I uses a chord sequence first heard at 3:21 in the Prologue. The lyrics describe the "Rocinante" spinning out of control, and the protagonist's body being destroyed ("every nerve is torn apart").  This section includes the highest note sung by Geddy Lee on any studio album (B♭6 at 9:27).  The song fades out with a repeated chord sequence – which returns at 11:56 in Book II – along with the sound of a beating heart.

Book II: Hemispheres
"Prelude" This section contains several themes heard later in the song, similar to the "Overture" in "2112."

"Apollo: Bringer of Wisdom" Apollo, the Greek god of the sun and the arts, represents the left hemisphere. 'Left-brainers' are often logical thinkers, adept at mathematics.

"Dionysus: Bringer of Love" Dionysus, the Greek god of wine and fertility, represents the right hemisphere. He stood for uninhibited desire in Nietzsche's Birth of Tragedy and Human, All Too Human and was the opposite of Apollo. 'Right-brainers' are more common than 'left-brainers,' and include people who are artistic and sensitive.

"Armageddon: The Battle of Heart and Mind" The title is reference to the Biblical war, but in this case Apollo and Dionysus pull man in opposite directions, toward Order or Chaos, respectively. The debate between classical and romantic (Apollonian and Dionysian) cultures is ongoing. The left stereo channel switches to the right for dramatic effect when Lee sings the word 'hemispheres'.

"Cygnus: Bringer of Balance" The chords played at the end of The Voyage return here. The explorer from The Voyage is frightened by the fighting and, after hearing the explorer's silent cry of terror, Apollo and Dionysus stop fighting and dub him Cygnus, god of Balance.

"The Sphere: A Kind of Dream" Jane Austen's novel Sense and Sensibility may be alluded to in the last few lines of the song.

Live performances
Rush performed the cycle (Book I followed by Book II) on the Hemispheres Tour and the Permanent Waves Tour. The band also played it on the Permanent Waves Warmup Tour, with the absence of Parts 2 (Apollo: Bringer of Wisdom) and 3 (Dionysus: Bringer of Love) from Book II. Book II: Prelude made a final appearance on the Counterparts Tour. Since then, an abbreviated version of book one was occasionally played live with only the instrumental section, as seen on Rush in Rio and R30. Occasionally, the "Prelude" from Book II was also performed. During the 2010-11 Time Machine Tour, the band played part of Book I at the conclusion of the final song, "Working Man." During the 2015 R40 Tour, the "Prelude" section from Book II was played, but tuned a step down to accommodate Geddy Lee's vocal range, which has decreased with age. The Prologue and part 3 of Book I were played immediately after as instrumentals, with a drum solo by Neil Peart ("The Story So Far") as an interlude.

See also
 List of Rush songs
 Cygnus X-1 (astronomical object)
 Apollonian and Dionysian

References

Rush (band) songs
1977 songs
1978 songs
Suites (music)
Greek mythology
Song recordings produced by Terry Brown (record producer)
Songs written by Neil Peart
Songs written by Geddy Lee
Songs written by Alex Lifeson